Hyperacusis is the increased sensitivity to sound and a low tolerance for environmental noise. Definitions of hyperacusis can vary significantly; it can refer to normal noises being perceived as: loud, annoying, painful, fear-inducing, or a combination of those, and is often categorized into four subtypes: loudness, pain, annoyance, and fear.

It can be a highly debilitating hearing disorder. Hyperacusis is often coincident with tinnitus. The latter is more common and there are important differences between their involved mechanisms.

Little is known about the prevalence of hyperacusis, in part due to the degree of variation in the term's definition. Reported prevalence in children and adolescents ranges from 3% to 17%. While there are no exact numbers, several people have comitted suicide due to the severe consequences of the disease. This includes Musician Jason DiEmilio (Azusa Plane). A hyperacusis sufferer in Belgium took his life in 2009, after years of struggling with catastrophic hyperacusis and tinnitus. A local government in Belgium made a short film based on this person's life, to warn others from the dangers of hyperacusis and tinnitus.

Signs and symptoms
In hyperacusis, the symptoms are ear pain, annoyance, distortions, and general intolerance to many sounds that most people are unaffected by. Crying spells or panic attacks may result from the experience of hyperacusis. It may affect only one or both ears.  Hyperacusis can also be accompanied by tinnitus. Hyperacusis can result in anxiety, stress and phonophobia. Avoidant behavior is often a response to prevent the effects of hyperacusis and this can include avoiding social situations.

Loudness hyperacusis 
Hyperacusis is most often characterized by a sensitivity to sound, where the perception of loudness is much greater than for a typical person; it is often associated with certain volumes and/or frequencies.  Hyperacusis can occur in children and adults, and can be either "short-term" in a duration of weeks to less than a year before recovery, or, less-commonly, "long-term", spanning years and in some cases becoming permanent.  Sensitivity is often different between ears.

Noxacusis (pain hyperacusis) 
In some instances, hyperacusis is accompanied by pain, which is known as noxacusis.  Noxacusis is characterized by pain resulting from sounds, often initiated at certain volumes or frequencies; pain can be immediate or delayed, and sometimes persists for an extended period of time following exposure.  Pain can be acute or chronic, and is often described as stabbing, burning, acid, or nerve pain, and is sometimes equated with the pain of a root canal or a broken tooth.

Loudness discomfort level (LDL) 
The threshold of sound at which discomfort is initially experienced; measured in decibels (dB).

Setback 
After a period of some relief from symptoms, discomfort resumes; often resulting from exposure to sound, or, in some cases, ototoxic medications or injuries.  Setback prevention is an important focus among those affected.

Associated conditions 
Some conditions that are associated with hyperacusis include:

 Acoustic shock
 Adverse drug reaction
 Anxiety
 Asperger syndrome
 Attention deficit hyperactivity disorder
 Autism spectrum
 Bell's palsy
 Depression
 Endolymphatic hydrops
 Fetal alcohol spectrum disorder
 Hypothyroidism
 Lyme disease
 Migraine
 Ménière's disease
 Temporomandibular joint disorder
 Trigeminal neuralgia
 Multiple sclerosis
 Noise-induced hearing loss
 Posttraumatic stress disorder
 Severe head trauma
 Sjögren syndrome
 Superior canal dehiscence syndrome (SCDS)
 Systemic lupus erythematosus (SLE)
 Tay–Sachs disease
 Tinnitus
 Tonic tensor tympani syndrome
 Visual snow
 Williams syndrome

Causes
The most common cause of hyperacusis is overexposure to excessively high decibel (sound pressure) levels.

Some affected people acquire hyperacusis suddenly as a result of taking ear sensitizing drugs, Lyme disease, Ménière's disease, head injury, or surgery. Others are born with sound sensitivity, develop superior canal dehiscence syndrome, have had a history of ear infections, or come from a family that has had hearing problems. Bell's palsy can trigger hyperacusis if the associated flaccid paralysis affects the tensor tympani, and stapedius, two small muscles of the middle ear. Paralysis of the stapedius muscle prevents its function in dampening the oscillations of the ossicles, causing sound to be abnormally loud on the affected side. Age may also be a significant factor .

Some psychoactive drugs such as LSD, methaqualone, or phencyclidine can cause hyperacusis. An antibiotic, ciprofloxacin, has also been seen to be a cause, known as ciprofloxacin-related hyperacusis. Benzodiazepine withdrawal syndrome is also a possible cause.

Audiologists may advise against using hearing protection in normal sound environments, claiming it can cause or worsen hyperacusis. Preliminary research showed that people with hyperacusis can experience an exacerbation of their symptoms when not adequately protecting themselves against loud sounds.
An acoustic shock can also occur after exposure to an unexpected moderately loud to loud noise, even if this does not necessarily result in permanent cochlear damage.

Neurophysiological mechanisms 

As one important mechanism, adaptation processes in the auditory brain that influence the dynamic range of neural responses are assumed to be distorted by irregular input from the inner ear. This is mainly caused by hearing loss related damage in the inner ear. The mechanism behind hyperacusis is not currently known, but it is suspected to be caused by damage to the inner ear and cochlea. It is theorized that type II afferent fibers become excited after damage to hair cells and synapses, triggering  a release of ATP in response. This release of ATP results in pain, sound sensitivity, and cochlear inflammation.

Diagnosis 

The basic diagnostic test is similar to a normal audiogram. The difference is that additionally to the hearing threshold at each test frequency also the lowest uncomfortable sound level is measured. This level is called loudness discomfort level (LDL), uncomfortable listening level (UCL), or uncomfortable loudness level (ULL). In patients with hyperacusis this level is considerably lower than in normal subjects, and usually across most parts of the auditory spectrum.

Treatment

Avoidance and Hearing Protection 
Setback prevention and reduction of pain symptoms are high priorities among those with hyperacusis and noxacusis, which is often managed through a combination of controlling the environment so as to avoid loud sounds, soundproofing, and wearing hearing protection, such as earplugs and/or safety earmuffs, such as the type used at firing ranges or industrial applications

Diet 
Diet may play a role in symptom management in some cases of hyperacusis, with response to a migraine diet, low-histamine diet, or low sodium diet.

Sound Therapy 
Sound therapy is sometimes recommended for those with hyperacusis, though its application among those with pain (noxacusis) should be used with caution. Tinnitus retraining therapy, a treatment originally used to treat tinnitus, uses broadband noise to treat hyperacusis. Pink noise can also be used to treat hyperacusis.  By listening to broadband noise at soft levels for a disciplined period of time each day, some patients can rebuild (i.e., re-establish) their tolerances to sound. More research is needed on the efficacy of sound therapy techniques when hyperacusis is the primary complaint, rather than a secondary symptom, indicating that "no strong conclusions can be made" about its efficacy at this time.

Cognitive Behavioral Therapy 
Another possible treatment is cognitive behavioral therapy (CBT), which may also be combined with sound therapy. However, randomized controlled trials with active control groups are still needed to establish the effectiveness of CBT for hyperacusis and the usefulness of CBT for noxacusis (pain hyperacusis) is not yet demonstrated in the scientific literature.

Society and culture

Notable cases
 Musician Jason DiEmilio, who recorded under the name Azusa Plane, had hyperacusis and ultimately went on to die by suicide due in part to his sensitivity to noise.
 Musician Stephin Merritt has monaural hyperacusis in his left ear, which influences the instrumentation of his band, The Magnetic Fields, leads him to wear earplugs during performances and to cover his affected ear during audience applause.
 Musician Laura Ballance of Superchunk has hyperacusis and no longer tours with the band.
 American politician, activist, and film producer Michael Huffington has mild hyperacusis and underwent sound therapy after finding that running tap water caused ear pain.
 Vladimir Lenin, the Russian communist revolutionary, politician, and political theorist, was reported seriously ill by the latter half of 1921, having hyperacusis and symptoms such as regular headache and insomnia.
 Musician Chris Singleton had hyperacusis, but made a full recovery.
 Musician Peter Silberman of The Antlers had hyperacusis and tinnitus which put his musical career on hold, until the conditions reduced down to a "manageable level". He has now resumed his musical career.
 Voice actor Liam O'Brien has hyperacusis, and was insomniac as a consequence.
 In April 2021, Internet personality, singer-songwriter and voice actor Tay Zonday stated that he has "debilitating autistic hyperacusis".
 Noelle Foley developed hyperacusis after getting a concussion and neck injury on a roller coaster.
 Racing driver Wolfgang Reip developed severe hyperacusis after several noise traumas during his racing career.
 British writer Linda Stratmann suffers from hyperacusis and reports noises "cut through her like a scalpel".
 Beethoven possibly suffered from hyperacusis alongside his hearing loss. In a letter, he wrote: "As soon as anybody shouts, I can’t bear it. Heaven alone knows what is to become of me."

See also 
 Misophonia
 Otoacoustic emission
 Sensory processing sensitivity
 Recruitment (medicine)

References 
 55. London Electricity Story (DJ) (2021) https://www.youtube.com/watch?v=BHWbfSGf200 - Full Hyperacusis Remission
56. When Ordinary Loud Sounds Hurt Your Ears (Joyce Cohen) 2022 - Article https://www.healthyhearing.com/report/53076-Hyperacusis-when-ordinary-loud-sounds-hurt-your-ears

57. It Feels Like A knife Is Being Stabbed into My Ears (Jessica Leeder) 2019 - Globe & Mail Article. https://www.theglobeandmail.com/life/article-it-feels-like-a-knife-is-being-stabbed-into-my-ears-says-sufferer-of/

58. Hyperacusis Central Promo "Educational" Video (David Vance, Shay Miles, Brian Newman) - https://www.youtube.com/watch?v=D84-tXPqFUU&t=5s

External links
 Hyperacusis Research
 Hyperacusis Central

Further reading 

 
 

Psychoacoustics
Diseases of the ear and mastoid process
Audiology
Rare diseases